Events from the year 1823 in the United Kingdom.

Incumbents
 Monarch – George IV
 Prime Minister – Robert Jenkinson, 2nd Earl of Liverpool (Tory)
 Foreign Secretary – George Canning 
 Parliament – 7th

Events
 January – the King's Library, George III's personal library of 65,000 volumes, 19,000 pamphlets, maps, charts and topographical drawings, is offered to the British Museum.
 23 January – in Paviland Cave on the Gower Peninsula, William Buckland inspects the "Red Lady of Paviland", the first identification of a prehistoric (male) human burial.
 20 February – explorer James Weddell's expedition to Antarctica reaches latitude 74°15' S and longitude 34°16'45" W, further south than any ship has reached previously, a record that will hold for more than 80 years.
 March – Royal Academy of Music opens in London.
 17 June – Charles Macintosh patents the waterproof material later used to make Mackintosh coats.
 July – Robert Peel ensures the passage of five Acts of Parliament, effectively abolishing the death penalty for over one hundred offences; in particular, the Judgement of Death Act allows judges to commute sentences for capital offences other than murder or treason to imprisonment or transportation.
 4 July – Transportation Act allows convicts transported to the colonies to be employed on public works.
 10 July – Gaols Act passed by Parliament, based on the prison reform campaign of Elizabeth Fry.
 23 September – First Burmese War: Burmese attack the British on Shapura, an island close to Chittagong.
 25 November – opening of The Royal Suspension Chain Pier at Brighton, designed by Captain Samuel Brown, RN, the first pleasure pier on the mainland of England.
 November – according to tradition, William Webb Ellis invents rugby.
 10 December – Mary Anning finds the first complete Plesiosaurus skeleton, on the Jurassic Coast.

Undated
 Beginning of the first Anglo-Ashanti war.
 Excise Act reduces duties on the distillation of whisky, encouraging its commercial production.
 Oxford Union established by students as the Oxford United Debating Society.

Publications
 Thomas Campbell's poem The Last Man.
 Thomas De Quincey's critical essay On the Knocking at the Gate in Macbeth (in The London Magazine, October).
 Mrs Markham's children's A History of England from the First Invasion by the Romans to the End of the Reign of George III.
 Sir Walter Scott's novels Peveril of the Peak, Quentin Durward and St. Ronan's Well.
 Thomas Wakley's medical journal The Lancet (first published 5 October ).
 The anonymous anthology of German short stories Popular Tales and Romances of the Northern Nations.

Births
3 January – Robert Whitehead, marine engineer (died 1905)
8 January – Alfred Russel Wallace, naturalist and biologist (died 1913)
23 February – John Braxton Hicks, obstetrician (died 1897)
19 April – Anna Laetitia Waring, poet (died 1910)
2 May – Emma Hardinge Britten, née Floyd, spiritualist (died 1899)
17 May – Henry Eckford, horticulturist (died 1905)
23 July – Coventry Patmore, poet (died 1896)
2 August – Edward Augustus Freeman, historian and politician (died 1892)
10 August – Charles Keene, illustrator (died 1891)
11 August – Charlotte Mary Yonge, novelist (died 1901)
13 August – Goldwin Smith, historian (died 1910)
3 September – Hardinge Giffard, 1st Earl of Halsbury, lawyer, Lord Chancellor (died 1921)
26 October – Sir Frederick Peel, politician (died 1906)
24 December – William Brighty Rands, writer, author of nursery rhymes (died 1882)
28 December – Augusta Theodosia Drane, religious writer and Catholic prioress (died 1894)

Deaths
 22 January – John Julius Angerstein, merchant, insurer and art collector (born 1735 in Russia)
 26 January – Edward Jenner, physician and pioneer of vaccination (born 1749)
 27 January – Charles Hutton, mathematician (born 1737)
 7 February – Mrs Radcliffe, writer (born 1764)
 26 February – John Philip Kemble, actor (born 1757)
 14 March – John Jervis, 1st Earl of St Vincent, Royal Navy admiral (born 1735)
 23 April – Joseph Nollekens, sculptor (born 1737)
 19 June – William Combe, writer, poet and adventurer (born 1742)
 8 July – Sir Henry Raeburn, Scottish portrait painter (born 1756)
 11 September – David Ricardo, economist (born 1772)
 23 September – Matthew Baillie, Scottish-born physician and pathologist (born 1761)
 30 October – Edmund Cartwright, clergyman and inventor of the power loom (born 1743)

See also
 1823 in Scotland

References

 
Years of the 19th century in the United Kingdom